Iraq (العراق) is a country in the Middle East, largely corresponding with the territory of ancient Mesopotamia.

Iraq may also refer to:

Places 
 Lower Mesopotamia, a region historically known as al-'Irāq al-'Arabi
 Upper Mesopotamia, northern part of the region between Tigris and Euphrates
 Iraq, an alternate name of Arak, Iran, a city in Markazi Province, Iran
 Iraq, an alternate name of Iraj, Isfahan, a village in Isfahan Province, Iran
 Persian Iraq, an obsolete term for a large region in western Iran (used in 11th–16th centuries)
 Iraq al Amir, a town in Jordan
 Iraq al-Manshiyya, a Palestinian Arab town in Gaza City
 Iraq Suwaydan, a Palestinian Arab village in Gaza City
 Iraq, Ludhiana, a village in the Punjab state of India

Other 
 The journal Iraq from the British Institute for the Study of Iraq
 "Iraq", a song by Iraqi-American rapper Timz
"Iraq", a song by American band Flobots from the UK edition of Fight with Tools
Delford "Iraq" Wade, a character in the 2014 video game Watch Dogs

See also 
 Iraqi (disambiguation)
 IRAC
 Interleukin-1 receptor-associated kinase (IRAK)